Vibbard is an unincorporated community in northwest Ray County, in the U.S. state of Missouri and part of the Kansas City metropolitan area.

The community is on Missouri Route M approximately three miles north of Wood Heights and five miles northeast of Excelsior Springs in adjacent Clay County.

Demographics

History
Vibbard was platted in 1870, and named after one Mr. Vibbard, a railroad employee. A post office called Vibbard was established in 1870, and remained in operation until 1939.

References

Unincorporated communities in Ray County, Missouri
Unincorporated communities in Missouri